The Millennium Trophy is a rugby union award contested annually by England and Ireland as part of the Six Nations Championship. It was initiated in 1988 as part of Dublin's millennial celebrations. The trophy has the shape of a horned Viking helmet. As of 2023, England have won it 20 times, and Ireland 16 times. 

Ireland are the current holders after beating England at the Aviva Stadium on 18 March 2023.

Overview

Results

Records

Longest winning streak: 6 – England, 1995–2000
Biggest winning margin: 40 points – Ireland 6–46 England, 1997
Smallest winning margin: 1 point – England 12–13 Ireland, 1994; Ireland 14–13 England, 2009
Highest aggregate: 68 points – England 50–18 Ireland, 2000
Lowest aggregate: 18 points – Ireland 6–12 England, 2013

References 

Six Nations Championship trophies
History of rugby union matches between England and Ireland
1988 establishments in Ireland
1988 establishments in England
International rugby union competitions hosted by Ireland
International rugby union competitions hosted by England
Recurring sporting events established in 1988